Rheia is the third studio album by Belgian band Oathbreaker. The album was produced by Jack Shirley and released through independent record label Deathwish Inc. on September 30, 2016. Oathbreaker toured internationally in support of Rheia from September until December with Skeletonwitch and Iron Reagan. The title references Rhea, mother goddess in Greek mythology.

Reception

Rheia was well received by music critics upon release. At Metacritic, which assigns a normalized rating out of 100 to reviews from mainstream publications, the album received an average score of 76, based on five reviews, indicating "generally favorable reviews." Exclaim!s Natalie Zina Walschots thought that the band has released "a vast and complex record that doesn't just react toward but actively embraces the aesthetics of doom and sludge." Andy O'Conor of Pitchfork said of the album: "While still fairly beholden to black metal, Rheia shares a core ideal with Cobalt's Slow Forever and Deafheaven's New Bermuda: They broke out of black metal's stylistic confines, using it as a launching pad more than a set of totalitarian marching orders, and in the process became emotive, powerful metal albums." PopMatters critic Chris Conaton described the record as "wonderful in terms of contrasting black metal fury with quieter moments," but thought that the songwriting lags behind the atmosphere." Sputnikmusic staff critic Tristan Jones described the album as "a swan song," writing that the record "demonstrates the band’s evident progress instrumentally and vocally and [Jack] Shirley’s influence takes them to new heights, and chasmic lows."

Accolades

Track listing 
All music and lyrics written by Oathbreaker.

Personnel 
Rheia personnel adapted from CD liner notes.

Oathbreaker 
 Lennart Bossu - Guitars
 Ivo Debrabandere - Drums
 Gilles Demolder - Guitars, Bass
 Caro Tanghe - Vocals

Additional musicians 
 Wim Coppers – drums on "Second Son of R.," "Being Able to Feel Nothing," "Needles in Your Skin" and "Where I Live"
 Treha Sektori – electronic arrangements on "I'm Sorry, This Is," "Where I Live" and "Where I Leave"

Production 
 Jack Shirley – recording, producing, engineering, mixing and mastering
 Oathbreaker – production

Artwork 
 Hemel – art direction
 Jeroen Mylle – photography
 We Became Aware – layout, design

Charts

References

External links 
 Rheia on Bandcamp

2016 albums
Oathbreaker (band) albums
Albums produced by Jack Shirley
Deathwish Inc. albums